Steel Industries Kerala Limited (Steel Industries Limited Kerala or SILK) is a state-owned steel manufacturing company in the state of Kerala, India. The company manufactures steel castings, does structural fabrications, building of small vessels and barges, breaking of ships and vessels. Steel and Industrial Forgings Ltd is a subsidiary of the company.

References 

State agencies of Kerala
Engineering companies of India
Companies based in Thrissur
1974 establishments in Kerala
Indian companies established in 1974
Government agencies established in 1974